Daeseongsa is a Buddhist temple of the Jogye Order in Seoul, South Korea. It is located at San 140-2 Seocho-dong, in the Seocho-gu area of the city.

See also
List of Buddhist temples in Seoul

External links
koreatemple.net

Buddhist temples in Seoul
Seocho District
Buddhist temples of the Jogye Order